The  is an electric multiple unit (EMU) train type operated in Japan by the private railway operator Hankyu Railway since 2006.

Formations
As of 1 April 2013, the fleet consisted of eleven eight-car sets formed as follows, with three motored (M) cars and five non-powered trailer (T) cars.

The "Mc1" and "M1" cars are each fitted with two single-arm pantographs.

References

External links

 Hankyu 9000 series (Japan Railfan Magazine Online) 

Electric multiple units of Japan
9000 series
Hitachi multiple units
1500 V DC multiple units of Japan